The HAL Twin Engine Deck Based Fighter (TEDBF) is a canard delta wing, twin-engine, carrier-based, multirole combat aircraft currently under development for the Indian Navy. The TEDBF is being designed and developed by the Aeronautical Development Agency (ADA), and will be manufactured by Hindustan Aeronautics Limited (HAL). The TEDBF is intended to perform a multitude of missions, including air supremacy, air interdiction, anti-access/area denial (A2/AD), anti-ship warfare (ASW) and electronic warfare (EW) missions.

The programme was officially announced in 2020, in response to the Indian Navy's dissatisfaction in operating a single-engine carrier-based fighter based on the HAL Tejas, and its eventual withdrawal from the naval LCA programme in 2016. A model of the aircraft was displayed at Aero India 2021. The first flight is expected to be in 2026, with production planned for 2031. 

The design's twin engines are expected to allow shorter take-offs from the Indian Navy’s Short Take-Off Barrier Arrested Recovery (STOBAR) aircraft carriers. As a dedicated deck-based fighter, it will feature foldable wings for more compact storage. The TEDBF will predominantly be equipped with indigenous weapons systems.

Development

Naval LCA programme 

The naval LCA programme to develop a carrier-based fighter for the Indian Navy was launched in 2003. The ADA was entrusted with the task of designing and developing a new naval fighter based on the existing Tejas template. The programme was envisaged to be completed in two phases - in the first phase, two prototypes were to be built, based on the Tejas Mk. 1 design. In the second phase, two more prototypes were to be built based on the Tejas Mk. 2 design. The programme was jointly funded by the Defence Research and Development Organisation (DRDO) and the Indian Navy, with the latter funding 40% and 60% of the developmental cost of naval LCA Mk. 1 and Mk. 2, respectively. In 2009, the Cabinet Committee on Security approved the development of Mk. 2 variant of the naval LCA. The first naval prototype, a two-seater NP-1, was rolled out in 2010, and first flew on 27 April 2012. By 2015, another naval LCA prototype, a single seater NP-2, had joined the programme, and carried out first ski jump assisted take off from a shore-based test facility (SBTF) in Goa. In December 2016, the Indian Navy opted out of the programme completely, with the cited reason being that the nav variant was 'overweight', and issued a fresh RFI for the immediate procurement of 57 Multi-Role Carrier Borne Fighters (MRCBF). The stalled programme was revived once again in 2018, under the oversight of the then defence minister, Ms. Nirmala Sitharaman. The flight tests were resumed with NP-1 and NP-2 for attaining technological maturity of the carrier based fighter. By early 2020, the naval LCA had successfully carried out night-time arrested landing at the Goa SBTF, and carrier landing and take off on the aircraft carrier .

TEDBF programme 
In April 2020, the ADA announced work on a new naval fighter based on the Indian Navy's MRCBF 2016 requirement to replace the existing fleet of Mikoyan MiG-29K carrier-based fighters. The new naval fighter unveiled at the Aero India airshow 2021 turned out to be of a twin engine, medium weight class fighter, now called Twin Engine Deck Based Fighter (TEDBF). The experience gained in the Naval LCA (N-LCA) programme is expected to help in the development of the TEDBF.

Government of India approved the TEDBF project in mid-2020. The aircraft will have canards to increase the lifting surface area, and will employ two General Electric F414 engines. The first flight is expected in 2026. According to Project Director TV Vinod Kumar, the estimated cost of four prototypes will be ₹14,000 crore. ADA is looking for joint development with Indian private sector. Indian Navy is planning the induction from 2032 when Mikoyan MiG-29K will start retiring. Upon the entry into service of the proposed , TEDBF will be modified for Catapult Assisted Take-Off Barrier Arrested Recovery (CATOBAR) operations. As an interim measure, Navy will procure Rafale M or Boeing F/A-18E/F Super Hornet until TEDBF is ready. Due to the TEDBF project, the Indian Navy reduced their orders for foreign fighters from 57 aircraft to 26, including trainer variants.     

A proposed air force variant of the TEDBF design, called the Omni-Role Combat Aircraft (ORCA) is also under study. The Indian Air Force is expected to need more than 750 aircraft between 2030 and 2050. ORCA, if funded, would be developed in parallel to the HAL AMCA. ADA will submit Preliminary Design Review on Q2 2023. The prototype will take 1,000 flights during test phase. TEDBF is undergoing wind-tunnel testing. DRDO is conducting high speed modelling to test the supersonic characteristics using internal funds.

Specifications

See also

References

Indian military aircraft procurement programs
Proposed aircraft of India
Twinjets
Carrier-based aircraft
Fourth-generation jet fighter
Proposed military aircraft